Breaded Life is a 2021 Nigerian dramedy film written and directed by Biodun Stephen. It was co-produced by Biodun Stephen, Tara Ajibulu and Kayode Sowade. It stars MC Lively, Bisola Aiyeola, Timini Egbuson, Bimbo Ademoye, Bolanle Ninalowo and Adedimeji Lateef. It was premiered on 10 April 2021 at iMax cinema Lagos and then released nationwide on 16 April 2021. It is a spin off of the 2016 romantic comedy, Picture perfect and contains some of the original cast members from Picture Perfect.

Plot 
Breaded Life follows the adventures of an arrogant and spoiled son, who comes from a wealthy home and is made to learn life lessons the hard way. It follows a misunderstood but bratty young man (Timini Egbuson) who falls in love with a bread seller (Bimbo Ademoye). His mother (Tina Mba) however vehemently decries the situation. His life with the bread seller exposes him to a life in the underworld where he gets arrested. This sets him down a war path with his mother.

Cast 

 MC Lively
 Bisola Aiyeola
 Timini Egbuson
 Bimbo Ademoye
 Bolanle Ninalowo
 Adedimeji Lateef
Tina Mba
Amuda Eko
Funny Bone
Jide Kosoko
Lizzy Jay
Nkechi Blessing Sunday
Tomiwa Sage
Karen Spikes

Production and release 
According to Biodun Stephen, Breaded Life is a true-life story inspired by the experiences of people around her.

The movie is combined with humor, romance and drama

The production is a collaboration between Shutterspeed project and David Wade. The filming lasted 16 days. The production team had to deal with Area Boys while filming at Agege Market.

Reception 
A reviewer for Sodas N Popcorn noted that Breaded Life "hit the right notes" but it had some flaws relating to the plot twist at the end and the general message of the film. Another reviewer concluded that the film was worth the cinema fee, however, noting that Egbuson had been type cast as a spoilt kid while Ninalowo had been type cast as an area boy. Nollywood Post, however, thinks that the movie is one of 2021's best

The movie grossed about ₦10 million in the opening weekend and ₦32 million by the second week.

Awards and nominations

References

External links 

Nigerian comedy-drama films
2021 comedy-drama films
2020s English-language films
English-language Nigerian films